Andrew Nisker (born 21 August 1978) is a retired Canadian professional tennis player.

Nisker reached a career high ATP singles ranking of World No. 756 achieved on 9 December 2002. He also had a career high ATP doubles ranking of World No. 207 achieved on 5 August 2002.

Nisker made his ATP Tour main draw debut in doubles at the 2002 Canada Masters held on hard courts in Toronto. Partnering up with compatriot Frank Dancevic, the pair received a wild card entry into the main doubles draw. They pulled off an upset victory in the first round by defeating Andrew Florent and Chris Haggard in three sets 3–6, 7–6(7–5), 6–2. They would go on to lose in the second round to seventh seeds and eventual semi-finalists David Prinosil and David Rikl in straight sets 4–6, 2–6.

Nisker attended Vanderbilt University on a scholarship. He won the NCAA Men's SEC Singles Championship in 2000. He competed at the 2003 Pan American Games held in Santo Domingo, Dominican Republic. Representing Canada, he lost in the singles first round to Santiago González in three sets 4–6, 6–3, 4–6.

Nisker reached his only career singles final in June 2002 at the Canada F1 ITF Futures tournament in Mississauga, Ontario, resulting in a loss to Trace Fielding. Additionally, he reached 11 career doubles finals, with a record of 3 wins and 8 losses which includes a 0–2 record in ATP Challenger finals.

ATP Challenger and ITF Futures finals

Singles: 1 (0–1)

Doubles: 11 (3–8)

References

External links
 
 

1978 births
Living people
Canadian male tennis players
Vanderbilt Commodores men's tennis players
Tennis players at the 2003 Pan American Games
Tennis players from Toronto
Pan American Games competitors for Canada
20th-century Canadian people
21st-century Canadian people